The Bengali freedom struggle refers to various movements and wars over the 18th, 19th and 20th centuries aimed at liberating the ethno-linguistic region of Bengal from colonial rule and later from ruling establishments located outside historic Bengali territory. During the 20th Century, Bengali nationalism developed and emerged as a popular political ideology glorifying the Bengali people as a distinctive cultural and linguistic nation.

Bengali Freedom movements
The following contains a list of Bengali struggles against colonial rule

Battle of Plassey                                              Battle of Buxar                                           
Indigo revolt
Chittagong uprising
Bengal Volunteers
Anushilan Samiti
United Bengal

The following contains a list of organized Bengali movements driven by Bengali nationalism. 
 
Bengali Language Movement
Six point movement
Non-cooperation movement
Bangladesh Liberation War

See also

 This time the struggle is for our freedom
 Sheikh Mujibur Rahman
 Subhas Chandra Bose
 Chittaranjan Das
 Maulana Abdul Hamid Khan Bhashani
 A. K. Fazlul Huq
 Bangladesh Awami League

External links
 
 Library of Congress (1988). A Country Study: Bangladesh

Freedom
History of social movements
Sheikh Mujibur Rahman
Indian independence movement
Bangladesh Liberation War
History of Pakistan